On the Way Down from the Moon Palace is the debut solo album by Lisa Germano. It was released in 1991 by her label, Major Bill Records. After she signed with Capitol in 1992, it was released in Japan by EMI, Capitol's parent company. The album was reissued by Egg Records in 1993 and Koch in 1999.

Track listing
"On the Way Down from the Moon Palace"
"Guessing Game or The Music Business"
"Blue Monday"
"Calling..."
"Hangin' with a Deadman"
"Screaming Angels Dancing in Your Garden"
"Riding My Bike"
"Simply Tony" 	
"Dig My Own Grave"
"Cry Baby"
"Bye Bye Little Doggie"
"The Other One"
"Dark Irie"

Personnel
 Lisa Germano – vocals, fiddle, violin
 Jeff Hedback – bass guitar
 Kenny Aronoff – drums

References

Lisa Germano albums
1991 debut albums